A Little Ain't Enough is the third full-length studio album by David Lee Roth, released on January 15, 1991 through Warner Music Group. It was certified gold on April 11, 1991. Produced by Bob Rock, the album featured the lead guitar work of Jason Becker, a then up-and-coming guitarist who was diagnosed with amyotrophic lateral sclerosis (ALS, aka Lou Gehrig's disease) a week after joining the band. He managed to finish recording the album, but was unable to tour in support of the album, as his condition left him with little strength in his hands.

The album marked the beginning of Roth's commercial decline, given the drop-off in sales from his prior two albums. During the year of the album's release, the Seattle grunge movement was beginning a sea-change in rock, and Roth's brand of glam metal was considered, by mainstream audiences, obsolete. Although the album went out of print on the Warner Bros. label in 1996, it was later reissued (in remastered form) in 2007 through the Friday Music label.

Release 
A music video for the title track, "A Lil' Ain't Enough" received significant play on MTV.

The song "Hammerhead Shark" is a cover and partial re-write of the song by the same title from the 1990 album "Walking on a Wire" by Lowen & Navarro.

Tour 
The tour supporting the record was successful in Europe but the American leg, supported by Extreme and Cinderella, turned into a financial failure, with low attendance and one-third of the shows cancelled due to poor ticket sales. Setlists were shortened and songs from the current album dropped as the US tour went on.

The touring band featured Ozzy Osbourne and Lizzy Borden guitarist Joe Holmes, bassist Todd Jensen from Hardline, longtime collaborators Gregg Bissonette and Brett Tuggle, and for the first few shows Desi Rexx from D'Molls as second guitarist.

Track listing

Personnel
 David Lee Roth – vocals, harmonica
 Jason Becker – lead guitar
 Steve Hunter – rhythm guitar, slide guitar
 Brett Tuggle – keyboards, vocal
 Gregg Bissonette – drums, percussion
 Matt Bissonette – bass, vocals
 Derry Byrne – brass
 Paul Baron – brass
 Ian Putz – brass
 Tom Keenlyside – brass
 Marc LaFrance – backing vocals
 David Steele – backing vocals
 John Webster – keyboards
 Jim McGillveray – percussion

Production 
 Bob Rock – producer, mixing
 Randy Staub – engineer
 Chris Taylor – 2nd engineer
 Brian Dobbs – 2nd engineer
 George Marino – mastering
 Jim Pezzullo – art direction, design
 Pete Angelus – concept
 David Lee Roth – concept

Charts

Certifications

References

David Lee Roth albums
1991 albums
Warner Records albums
Albums produced by Bob Rock
Glam metal albums